Hussein Mabrouk (born 30 April 1980) is an Egyptian handball player. He competed in the men's tournament at the 2008 Summer Olympics.

His brothers, Ashraf, Hazem, Belal, Ibrahim and Hassan, are also international handball players.

References

External link

1980 births
Living people
Egyptian male handball players
Olympic handball players of Egypt
Handball players at the 2008 Summer Olympics
21st-century Egyptian people